The following lists events that happened during 2021 in South America.

Incumbents

Argentina

President: Alberto Fernández (since 2019)
Vice President: Cristina Fernández de Kirchner (since 2019)

Argentina claims sovereignty over part of Antarctica, the Islas Malvinas, and South Georgia and the South Sandwich Islands.

Bolivia

 President: Luis Arce 
 Vice President: David Choquehuanca

Brazil

President: Jair Bolsonaro (since 2019)
Vice President: Hamilton Mourão (since 2019)

Chile

President: Sebastián Piñera (since 2018)
President of the Senate: Adriana Muñoz (since 2020)
President of the Chamber of Deputies: Diego Paulsen (since 2020)

Chile includes the Juan Fernández Islands and Easter Island in the Pacific Ocean. It also claims Chilean Antarctic Territory.

Easter Island
Alcalde: Pedro Edmunds Paoa

Juan Fernández Islands
Alcalde: Felipe Paredes Vergara

Colombia

 President: Iván Duque Márquez
 Vice President: Marta Lucía Ramírez

Ecuador

President: Lenín Moreno
Vice President: María Alejandra Muñoz

Galápagos Islands
Governor – Jorge Torres (since 2008)

Guyana

President: Irfaan Ali (since 2020)
Prime Minister: Mark Phillips (since 2020)

Guayana Esequiba is administered by Guyana but claimed by Venezuela. Tigri Area is disputed with Suriname.

Paraguay

President: Mario Abdo Benítez (since 2018)
Vice President: Hugo Velázquez Moreno (since 2018)

Peru

President: Francisco Sagasti
Prime Minister: Violeta Bermúdez

Suriname

President: Chan Santokhi (since 2020)
Vice President: Ronnie Brunswijk (since 2020)

Tigri Area is disputed with Guyana.

Uruguay

Executive branch

Legislative branch

Judiciary branch 
 Supreme Court of Justice: Tabaré Sosa Aguirre (President and Minister), Elena Martínez Rosso (Minister), Bernardette Minvielle Sánchez (Minister), Luis Tosi Boeri (Minister), John Pérez Brignani (Minister).

Venezuela

President: Nicolás Maduro, disputed by Juan Guaidó
 Vice President: Delcy Rodríguez

Venezuela claims Guayana Esequiba as part of its territory.

British Overseas Territories

Monarch: Charles III (since 2022)

Falkland Islands

Governor: Nigel Phillips (since 2017)
Chief Executive:
Barry Rowland (2016-2021)
Andy Keeling (since 2021)

The Falkland Islands are also claimed by Argentina, which calls them Islas Malvinas (Malvinas Islands).

Saint Helena, Ascension and Tristan da Cunha
Governor of Saint Helena: Philip Rushbrook
Administrator of Ascension: Justine Allan
Administrators of Tristan da Cunha: Fiona Kilpatrick and Stephen Townsend

South Georgia and the South Sandwich Islands
Commissioner: Nigel Phillips (since 2017)

French Guiana

President: Emmanuel Macron (since 2017)
Prime Minister: Jean Castex (since 2020)
Prefect: Thierry Queffelec

Events

January and February
January 8 – Twenty-three killed in La Vega massacre in Caracas, Venezuela.
January 14 – The hospital system in Manaus, Amazonas, Brazil, is overwhelmed with 2,516 new infections and 254 hospitalisations. Hospitals report shortages of oxygen (O2).
January 17 – Antony Blinken, President-elect Joe Biden's United States Secretary of State, says that the U.S. will continue to recognize Juan Guaidó as legitimate president of Venezuela.
January 21
The European Parliament calls on EU governments to recognize Juan Guaido as Venezuela's interim president.
Venezuela stops two Guyanese fishing boats in Esequiba. The crews were freed on February 3.
January 23 – COVID-19 pandemic: Brazil begins vaccination with two million doses of Oxford–AstraZeneca COVID-19 vaccine made in India.
January 28 – The Lowy Institute, an independent think tank in Australia, rates the adequacy of 98 countries′ COVID-19 pandemic response. Brazil, Mexico, and Colombia are the lowest rated, at numbers 98, 97, and 96, respectively.
January 29
Peru sends troops to its border with Ecuador to impede immigration, principally from Venezuela.
It was announced that the USCGC Stone would not make its scheduled stop in Argentina after visiting Guyana, Brasil, and Uruguay. The ship is on a mission to stop illegal fishing, valued at $151 billion in 2018, and coming mostly from China, South Korea, Indonesia, and Taiwan. Montevideo is the second-most important pirate port in the world.
February 8 – Kristalina Georgieva of the International Monetary Fund (IMF) predicts that Latin American and Caribbean economic activity will not return to pre-pandemic levels of output until 2023 and GDP per capita will catch up only in 2025.
February 19 – The Group of Seven (G-7) promises an equitable distribution of COVID-19 vaccines, although few details have been provided.

March and April
March 10 – Ecuador condemns Argentine President Alberto Fernández's statements about Lenín Moreno as interference in their affairs. When asked about his relationship with vice president Cristina Kirchner, Fernandez replied, “Yo no soy Lenín Moreno. Los que imaginaron eso no me conocen” (“I am not Lenín Moreno. Those who imagine otherwise do not know me").
April 2
Verónika Mendoza, leftist candidate for president of Peru, calls Venezuelan President Nicolás Maduro a dictator during a press conference with the Asociación de Prensa Extranjera en el Perú (APEP).
Planes from Bolivarian Military Aviation (National Bolivarian Armed Forces of Venezuela) are filmed flying over Colombian territory.

Programmed and scheduled events

Elections

February 1 – 2021 President of the Federal Senate of Brazil election
February 2 – 2021 President of the Chamber of Deputies of Brazil election
February 7 – 2021 Ecuadorian general election
April 4
2021 Chilean municipal elections
 2021 Chilean constitutional convention elections
 April 11 – 2021 Peruvian general election
 November 4 – 2021 Falkland Islands general election
 November 21 – 2021 Chilean general election
TBA
November
2020 Paraguayan municipal elections 
2021 Guyanese local elections

Major holidays

January to April

January 1 – New Year's Day
February 15–16 — Carnival
February 23 – Republic Day, Public holidays in Guyana.
February 25 – Day of Liberation and Innovation, Suriname.
March 24 – Day of Remembrance for Truth and Justice, Public holidays in Argentina.
March 29 – Phagwah, Guyana and Suriname.
April 19 – Landing of the 33 Patriots Day, Public holidays in Uruguay.
April 21 – Tiradentes Day, Public holidays in Brazil.

May to August

May 1 – Labour Day and International Workers' Day
May 15 – Independence Day, Public holidays in Paraguay.
May 24 – Battle of Pichincha Day, Public holidays in Ecuador.
May 26 – Independence Day, Guyana.
June 10 – Abolition Day, French Guiana.
June 12 – Queen Elizabeth II's Birthday, Commonwealth of Nations.
June 14 – Liberation Day (Falkland Islands).
June 19 – José Gervasio Artigas Birthday, Public holidays in Uruguay.
June 21 – Andean New Year, Public holidays in Bolivia, Chile, and Peru.
June 24 – Battle of Carabobo Day and Feast of John the Baptist, Public holidays in Venezuela.
June 29 – Feast of Saints Peter and Paul.
July 1 – Ketikoti, Emancipation Day in Suriname.
July 5 – Independence Day (Venezuela).
July 9 – Independence Day, Argentina.
July 14 – Fête nationale celebrated in French Guiana.
July 20 – Colombian Declaration of Independence.
July 24 – Simón Bolívar′s Birthday.
July 28–29 — Fiestas Patrias (Peru).
August 2 – Emancipation Day, Guyana.
August 6 – Independence Day, Bolivia,
August 7 – Battle of Boyacá Day, Public holidays in Colombia.
August 9 – Independence Day, Ecuador.
August 25 – Independence Day, Uruguay.
August 30 – Feast of St. Rose of Lima, patroness of Peru.

September to December

September 7 – Independence Day (Brazil).
September 18–19 — Fiestas Patrias (Chile).
September 29 – Battle of Boquerón Day, Paraguay.
October 8 – Independence of Guayaquil, Ecuador.
October 12 – Feast of Our Lady of Aparecida, patroness of Brazil.
November 2 – Independence of Cuenca.Ecuador.
November 15
Proclamation of the Republic (Brazil).
Independence of Cartagena, Colombia Day.
November 25 – Independence Day, Suriname.
December 25 – Christmas

Culture

Sports
January 30 – 2020 Copa Libertadores Final.
September 11–14 — 3X3 Basketball at the 2021 Junior Pan American Games in Cali, Colombia.

Deaths

January and February
January 3 – Salvador Franco, Venezuelan Indigenous rights leader; died in prison.
January 4 – Guillermo Rodríguez Melgarejo, 77, Argentine Bishop of Roman Catholic Diocese of San Martín in Argentina (2003–2018).
January 8 – Cástor Oswaldo Azuaje Pérez, 69, Bishop of Roman Catholic Diocese of Trujillo, Venezuela (since 2012); COVID-19.
January 11 – Luis Adriano Piedrahita, 74, Colombian Roman Catholic bishop and theologian; COVID-19; (b. 1946)
January 13 – Eusébio Scheid, 88, Brazilian Roman Catholic cardinal, Archbishop of Roman Catholic Archdiocese of São Sebastião do Rio de Janeiro (2001–2009); COVID-19.
January 24 – Brazilians who died during the 2021 Tocantinense aviation disaster:
Marcus Molinari, 23, footballer (Tupi, Ipatinga, Tupynambás).
Lucas Meira, 32, football executive, president of Palmas Futebol e Regatas.
Guilherme Noé, 28, footballer (Batatais, Rio Preto, Ipatinga).
Lucas Praxedes, 23, footballer.
Ranule, 27, footballer (Atlético Itapemirim, Democrata, Resende).
January 26 – Carlos Holmes Trujillo, 69, Colombian politician, Defense Minister; COVID-19.
February 9 – José Maranhão, 87, Brazilian politician, Deputy (1983–1994), Senator (2003–2009, since 2015) and Governor of Paraíba (1995–2002, 2009–2011); COVID-19.
February 14 – Carlos Menem, 90, Argentine politician (Justicialist Party), national senator (2005-2021), President of Argentina (1989-1999).
February 16 – Gustavo Noboa, 83, President of Ecuador (2000–2003) and Vice President (1998–2000), Governor of Guayas Province (1983–1984); heart attack.

March and April
March 3 – Sérgio Eduardo Castriani, 66, Brazilian archbishop of Roman Catholic Archdiocese of Manaus (2012–2019); sepsis.

November
November 5 – Marília Mendonça, 26, Brazilian singer and Grammy winner (2019); air crash

See also

2020s
2020s in political history
Mercosur
Organization of American States
Organization of Ibero-American States
Caribbean Community
Union of South American Nations

References

 
2020s in South America
Years of the 21st century in South America